Arikantha Mahaphruekpong, formerly Ramita Mahapruekpong (was born 23 July 1989 at Bangkok, Thailand), she is a Thai actress, and host. She is currently an undergraduate student at the University of London through its International Programmes. Her sister Keerati Mahaplearkpong is also an actress.

Works

Filmography

TV Drama

TV Series

Hosts

Magazine covers 

 You and Me vol. 26 no. 595 October 2009
 Kazz vol. 2 no. 43 November 2009

Advertisements 
 Rexona
 Calpis Lacto Soda
 Chevrolet Sonic Hatchback

References

External links
 Facebook
 Twitter
 Instagram 
 Fanpage

1989 births
Living people
Arikantha Mahaphruekpong
Arikantha Mahaphruekpong
Alumni of University of London Worldwide
Alumni of the University of London
Arikantha Mahaphruekpong
Arikantha Mahaphruekpong
Arikantha Mahaphruekpong
Arikantha Mahaphruekpong
Arikantha Mahaphruekpong
Arikantha Mahaphruekpong
Arikantha Mahaphruekpong